Simon Augustin Falette (born 19 February 1992) is a professional footballer who plays as a centre back for Turkish club Hatayspor. Born in France, he represents the Guinea national team.

Club career
Falette started playing football at Tours before moving to the youth teams of Lorient in 2007. On 18 February 2012, he made his Ligue 1 debut for the first team of Lorient in a 0–1 loss against Lille. He spent the 2012–13 season on loan at Ligue 2 side Laval. In the following season, he was again loaned out to Ligue 2, this time to Brest. Brest made the transfer permanent in the summer of 2014. Falette moved to first division team Metz prior to the 2016–17 season, where he was a regular starter and made 35 appearances in league matches, scoring three goals.

In August 2017, Falette moved to Bundesliga club Frankfurt on a four-year deal. He made his first appearance for his new club on the first matchday of the 2017–18 season in a 0–0 draw against Freiburg. On 10 February 2018, he scored his first and only goal in the German first league in a 4–2 victory against 1. FC Köln. On 19 May 2018, Falette won the 2017–18 DFB-Pokal with his team, but didn't play in the final.

On 5 October 2020, Falette joined Hannover 96. He joined Hatayspor in 2021.

International career
Falette was born in France to a French Guianan father, Albert, who was also a footballer, and a Guinean Loma mother. He was called up to the French Guiana national football team in 2015. 

In October 2018, he was approached by the Guinea national team, on the basis that his grandmother was born there. He made his debut for Guinea on 18 November 2018, in an Africa Cup of Nations qualifier against Ivory Coast. In the 2019 Africa Cup of Nations, he appeared as a starter in all four matches his team played in the tournament before dropping our after losing to Algeria in the round of 16.

Career statistics

Club

International

References

External links
 
 

1992 births
Living people
Footballers from Le Mans
Citizens of Guinea through descent
Guinean footballers
Guinea international footballers
French footballers
French sportspeople of Guinean descent
French people of French Guianan descent
Guinean expatriate footballers
Association football defenders
Ligue 1 players
Ligue 2 players
Championnat National 2 players
Bundesliga players
Süper Lig players
2. Bundesliga players
FC Lorient players
Stade Lavallois players
Stade Brestois 29 players
FC Metz players
Eintracht Frankfurt players
Fenerbahçe S.K. footballers
Hannover 96 players
Hatayspor footballers
French expatriate footballers
Expatriate footballers in Germany
Expatriate footballers in Turkey
Guinean expatriate sportspeople in Germany
Guinean expatriate sportspeople in Turkey
2019 Africa Cup of Nations players
Black French sportspeople